Shin Takamatsu (born August 5, 1948 in Nima, Shimane) is a leading Japanese architect. After he obtained PhD from Graduate School of Engineering, Kyoto University, in 1980, he became a lecturer at Osaka University of Arts in 1981, an associate professor at Kyoto Seika University in 1987, a professor at Graduate School of Engineering, Kyoto University in 1997 and professor emeritus at Kyoto University in 2013.  Takamatsu's futuristic looking buildings often use anthropomorphic or mechanical imagery.

Notable projects
 Komakinetei, 1977, Hyogo Prefecture, Takarazuka, Japan
 Kido clinic, 1978, Kita-ku, Kyoto, Japan (not existing)
 Yamamoto Atelier, 1978, Nishikyo-ku, Kyoto, Japan
 Hubei electric second companies shop, 1978, Shimogyo-ku, Kyoto, Japan
 Ichon dyeing factory building, 1979, Ukyo-ku, Kyoto, Japan (not existing)
 Yamaguchi photo studio, 1980, Joyo, Kyoto, Japan
 Sasaki confectionery, 1978, Sakyo-ku, Kyoto, Japan
 Origin I, 1981, Kamigyo-ku, Kyoto, Japan (not existing)
 Shugakuin house I, 1981, Sakyo-ku, Kyoto, Japan
 Shimogamo house, 1982, Sakyo-ku, Kyoto, Japan
 Saifukuji Temple, 1982, Kani, Gifu, Japan
 Miyahara House, 1982, Kamigyo-ku, Kyoto, Japan
 Yoshida House, 1982, Nakagyo-ku, Kyoto, Japan
 Origin II, 1982, Kamigyo-ku, Kyoto, Japan (not existing)
 Terada of house, 1983, Joyo, Kyoto, Japan
 Ark Nishina dental clinic, 1983, Fushimi-ku, Kyoto, Japan
 Waterworks bureau staff's house, 1983, Higashisumiyoshi-ku, Osaka, Japan
 Pharaoh dental clinic, 1984, Minami-ku, Kyoto, Japan
 Garden, 1984, Nakagyo-ku, Kyoto, Japan
 Kyoto traditional craft Expo Theme Pavilion, 1984, Minami-ku, Kyoto, Japan (not existing)
 Dance Hall, 1984, Nagoya, Aichi Prefecture, Naka-ku, Japan
 Shugakuin house II, 1985, Sakyo-ku, Kyoto, Japan
 Week, 1986, Kita-ku, Kyoto, Japan (not existing)
 Ogura Flats, 1986, Uji, Kyoto, Japan
 Miyata House, 1986, Kita-ku, Kyoto, Japan
 Matsui House, 1986, Kita-ku, Kyoto, Japan
 Zach, 1986, Kita-ku, Kyoto, Japan
 Mon, 1986, Kita-ku, Kyoto, Japan
 School, 1986, Naka-ku, Nagoya, Japan
 Origin III, 1986, Kamigyo-ku, Kyoto, Japan (not existing)
 Unagidani Ining'23, 1987, Chuo-ku, Osaka, Japan
 Gazon-E, 1987, Moriyama, Shiga, Japan
 Cube Minamimukonoso, 1987, Amagasaki , Hyogo Prefecture, Japan
 Cube AMX, 1987, Amagasaki, Hyogo Prefecture, Japan
 '87 World castle Expo venue, 1987, Shiga Prefecture Hikone, Japan (not existing)
 Maruhigashi Gion building, 1987, Higashiyama-ku, Kyoto, Japan
 MK Oil Higashigojo gas station, 1987, Yamashina-ku, Kyoto, Japan
 Kirin Plaza, 1987, Chuo-ku, Osaka, Japan (not existing)
 Kitayama Ining'23, 1987, Sakyo-ku, Kyoto, Japan
 Orphe, 1987, Nishio, Aichi, Japan
 Yodoyabashi Imanishi Bill 3, 1987, Chuo-ku, Osaka, Japan
 Auberge, 1987, Ukyo-ku, Kyoto, Japan
 Tatoo, 1989, Sapporo, Hokkaido, Japan
 Station MK, 1989, Higashiyama-ku, Kyoto, Japan
 Strawberries and main building, 1989, Chofu, Tokyo, Japan (not existing)
 Solaris, 1990, Amagasaki, Hyogo Prefecture
 SYNTAX, 1990, Sakyo-ku, Kyoto, Japan (not existing)
 Nima Sand Museum, 1990, Oda, Shimane, Japan
 Imanishi Motoakasaka, 1991, Minato, Tokyo, Japan
 Earth Tech char sub-one, 1991, Shibuya, Tokyo, Japan
 Ueno Green Club, 1992, Taito, Tokyo, Japan
 Octagon, 1992, Shibuya, Tokyo, Japan
 ORC Project, 1992, (not realized)
 Kunibiki Messe hall, Shimane, 1993
 Shimane Prefectural Industrial Exchange Hall Kunibiki Messe, 1993, Matsue , Shimane Prefecture, Japan
 Hotel Ravie Kawaryo, 1994, Ito, Shizuoka, Japan
 Quasar, 1995, Berlin, Germany
 Shoji Ueda Museum of Photography, 1995, Hoki, Tottori, Japan
 Kirin Headquarters, 1995, Chuo, Tokyo, Japan (not existing)
 Nagasaki Port Passenger Terminal, 1995, Nagasaki, Japan
 Mihonoseki Sea Gakuen hometown Creation Museum Meteor Plaza, 1995, Matsue, Shimane Prefecture, Japan
 Hamada World Children's Museum, 1996, Hamada, Shimane, Japan
 Minato Sakai Exchange Center, 1997, Sakaiminato, Tottori, Japan
 Sugawara Lifelong Learning (Social) Center, 1997, Hirakata, Osaka, Japan
 Kitanagoya Community Center, 1997, Kitanagoya, Aichi Prefecture, Japan
 Fuchu Community Center, 1998, Fuchu, Hiroshima, Japan
 Nose Myoken-san Worship Hall, 1998, Kawanishi, Hyogo, Japan
 Higashi Honganji Reception Hall, 1998, Shimogyo-ku, Kyoto, Japan
 Wacoal Headquarters, 1998, Minami-ku, Kyoto, Japan
 Babelsberg fx. Center, 1999, Potsdam, Germany
 Shikatsu Community Center, 2000 Shikatsu, Aichi, Japan
 Black Pearl, 2002, Taipei, Taiwan
 National Theatre Okinawa, 2003, Urasoe, Okinawa, Japan
 Tianjin Museum, 2004, Tianjin, China
 Namba Hips, 2007, Chuo-ku, Osaka, Japan
 Bidzina Ivanishvili residence, Tbilisi, Georgia, 2007
 Formosa Boulevard Station of Kaohsiung MRT, 2008, Sinsing District, Kaohsiung, Taiwan
 Marumisangyo Headquarters, 2008, Nagoya, Japan
 Shitennoji Gakuen Elementary School, 2009, Fukushima-ku, Osaka, Japan
 Doshisha International Institute, 2011, Kizugawa, Kyoto, Japan

References

External links 

 Shin Takamatsu Architect & Associates Co, Ltd.
 Article from Archined News

1948 births
Japanese architects
Living people